The eighteenth season of the American animated television series The Simpsons aired from September 10, 2006 to May 20, 2007. The season contained seven hold-over episodes from season 17’s HABF production line. Al Jean served as the showrunner, a position he has held since the thirteenth season, while the season was produced by Gracie Films and 20th Century Fox Television.

The season finale, "You Kent Always Say What You Want", was the series' 400th episode. Additionally, the Simpsons franchise celebrated its 20th anniversary, as it has been on the air since April 1987, beginning with shorts on The Tracey Ullman Show.

Season 18 included guest appearances by Metallica, Tom Wolfe, Gore Vidal, Michael Chabon, Ludacris, Jonathan Franzen, Fran Drescher, The White Stripes, Kiefer Sutherland, Mary Lynn Rajskub, Richard Lewis, Dr. Phil, Elvis Stojko, Natalie Portman, Jon Lovitz, Betty White, Eric Idle, Sir Mix-a-Lot, Stephen Sondheim, Ronaldo, Meg Ryan, Andy Dick, Peter Bogdanovich, James Patterson and others.

Reception

Critical reception
Robert Canning of IGN gave the season a 6.6 saying it was "Passable" and that "Now in its eighteenth season (go ahead, say that out loud: 'eighteen seasons'), The Simpsons continues to supply America with a decent half-hour of comedy every Sunday night. However, most long-time fans of the show agree that the last several years have seen the program in constant decline. Looking back at this particular season, there's little evidence to prove them wrong. Though we were treated with at least a few hilarious gems this year, the mediocre (to the downright terrible) heavily outweighed the great."

Awards
At the 35th Annie Awards, Alf Clausen and Michael Price won the award for "Best Music in an Animated Television Production" for "Yokel Chords" while Ian Maxtone-Graham and Billy Kimball won "Best Writing in an Animated Television Production" for "24 Minutes" Jeff Westbrook won a WGA Award for "Kill Gil: Vols. 1 & 2" while Matt Selman was nominated for "The Haw-Hawed Couple" and John Frink received a nomination for "Stop, or My Dog Will Shoot".

The series also received a British Comedy Award nomination for "Best International Comedy" a Primetime Emmy Award nomination for Outstanding Animated Program for "The Haw-Hawed Couple" and an Environmental Media Award nomination for "Best Television Episodic Comedy" for "The Wife Aquatic".

Nielsen ratings
The show ranked 60th in the seasonal ratings with an average of 8.6 million watching it and a Nielsen rating of 4.1/10.

Episodes

DVD release
Series showrunner Al Jean reported in April 2015 that The Simpsons would no longer see home media releases after the seventeenth season, claiming an inability for DVD sales to keep up with the rise in streaming and downloads, as well as a boom in FXX reruns, and Fox's on-demand video service, FXNOW. Jean reassured that bonus features commonly featured on the DVDs, such as commentaries for each episode, would still be available, now packaged with the digital format.

In 2016, audio commentary for the 18th season was made available exclusively through FXNOW.

On Saturday, July 22, 2017, it was announced during the San Diego Comic-Con 2017 panel that, due to fan demand, the eighteenth season DVD would be released after all on Tuesday, December 5, 2017, in the United States and Canada by 20th Century Fox Home Entertainment, ten years after it had completed broadcast on television.

References

Bibliography

External links
 Season 18 at The Simpsons.com

Simpsons season 18
2006 American television seasons
2007 American television seasons